KA/Þór is a women's handball team located in Akureyri, Iceland. It is a joint team of Knattspyrnufélag Akureyrar (KA) and Þór Akureyri. In 2021, the team won the Icelandic championship for the first time.

History
Prior to the 2012-2013 season, the team withdrew from play in Úrvalsdeild kvenna after five of its most experienced players left the team during the summer. In January 2017, the board of KA declared that it intended to break the cooperation between the clubs in handball and women's football. The clubs had been sending a joint team in men's and women's handball called Akureyri Handboltafélag and KA/Þór, and in women's football under the name Þór/KA. In the end, KA reversed on its decision regarding the women's teams but withdrew from the cooperation of the men´s handball team. The football team, Þór/KA went on to win the 2017 national championship while the handball team, KA/Þór, won the second-tier 1. deild kvenna in 2018 and gained promotion to Úrvalsdeild kvenna.

On 6 September 2020, KA/Þór won the Super Cup by beating Fram 30-23. In May 2021, the team posted the best record in the Úrvalsdeild for the first time. On 6 June 2021, the team won its first national championship after beating Valur in the Úrvalsdeild finals.

On 2 October 2021, KA/Þór won the Icelandic Cup for the first time after beating Fram in the Cup finals.

Coaches
Jónatan Magnússon 2016-2019
Andri Snær Stefánsson 2019-

Trophies and achievements

Titles
Icelandic championship:
2021
Icelandic Cup
2021
Icelandic Super Cup:
2020
 1. deild kvenna:
 2018

Awards

Úrvalsdeild Playoffs MVP
2021 - Martha Hermannsdóttir

1. deild kvenna Player of the Year
2017 - Martha Hermannsdóttir
2018 - Martha Hermannsdóttir

1. deild kvenna Coach of the Year
2017 - Jónatan Þór Magnússon
2018 - Jónatan Þór  Magnússon

Source

Team

Current squad
Squad for the 2022-23 season

Goalkeepers
 1  Matea Lonac
 16  Telma Ósk Þórhallsdóttir
Wingers
RW
 6  Telma Lísa Elmarsdóttir
LW
 5  Anna Mary Jónsdóttir
 7  Katrín Vilhjálmsdóttir
 11  Kristín Aðalheiður Jóhannsdóttir
 17  Unnur Ómarsdóttir
Line players
 4  Júlía Sóley Björnsdóttir
 5  Hrafnhildur Irma Jónsdóttir
 13  Anna Þyrí Halldórsdóttir

Back players
LB
 23  Lydia GunnÞórsdóttir
 34  Svala Svavarsdóttir
CB
 18  Nathalia Soares 
 19  Hildur Marin Andrésdóttir
 29  Agnes Tryggvadóttir
RB
 9  Aþena Sif Einvarðsdóttir
 25  Rut Arnfjörð Jónsdóttir
 27  Hildur Jónsdóttir

Transfers

Transfers for the season 2023-24

 Joining

 Leaving

Technical staff
  Head Coach: Andri Snær Stefánsson
  Assistant coach: Sigþór Árni Heimisson
  Chairman: Erlingur Kristjánsson
  Sportdirector: Siguról Sigurðsson
  Team Leader: Erla Hleiður Tryggvadóttir

References

External links
 

Handball teams in Iceland
Women's handball clubs